Springfield Central Railway Station is the terminus station of the Springfield Line in Queensland, Australia. It serves Springfield Central (the central suburb of Greater Springfield) and other nearby suburbs in the City of Ipswich. Brisbane-bound services depart half-hourly during off-peak times, with most travelling to Kippa-Ring. The station was opened in December 2013 after the line was extended from Richlands.

History
Springfield Central Station was part of the Queensland Government's Darra to Springfield Transport Corridor project, aimed at providing effective public transport infrastructure for the fast-growing western region between Brisbane and Ipswich. Works began on the extension to Springfield Central after Richlands Station was completed in early 2011. Initially, Springfield Central station was planned to be named Springfield, with the current Springfield station to be named Springfield Lakes. A public open day was held on 1 December 2013 following the completion of the line, with scheduled services commencing at 5:39 am the next morning, on Monday.

Station precinct
Springfield Central Station's 12 m (39 ft) wide island platform is elevated above the station concourse and is almost entirely covered by the roof structure (a feature not present in most Queensland Rail City Network stations). The concourse runs the length of the station, and is surrounded by glass along large portions of both sides. Toilets and secure bicycle storage facilities are located on the concourse. There are go card gate terminals at both ends of the concourse, with the station office located on the western end. A coffee shop once occupied the same position on the eastern end; however, the café has since closed. Flights of stairs are located at both ends to reach the platform, as well as escalators and a lift for disability access towards the middle.

There are multiple electronic display screens located along the length of the platform and at either end of the concourse to provide customers with information regarding departing services, as well as prominent permanent signage (including some with braille for the visually impaired) throughout the precinct. Customers with hearing impairment are able to use an audio induction loop through their hearing aids in order to listen directly to station announcements.

The station precinct incorporates a platform-length series of bus bays (only one of which is currently in use) on the northern side and a pick-up/drop-off zone on the southern side. On the southern side of the Centenary Highway is a 100-vehicle car park, with an additional 400 spaces available off Springfield Greenbank Arterial Road, connected to the station concourse by a footbridge. The 400-space car park was completed in early 2014 following a reassessment of parking availability, as it was determined that 100 spaces would be insufficient for the number of people using the station. Road and pedestrian access to the station is via two highway underpasses from Southern Cross Circuit—one on Trackstar Drive, and the other on Sir Llew Edwards Drive—as well as via the 400-space car park. Both underpasses are bordered by painted murals.

Services

Springfield Central is served mainly by trains operating to and from Kippa-Ring. These trains stop at all stations to Bowen Hills, then run express to Northgate, stopping at Eagle Junction. Some afternoon services continue past Petrie to Caboolture instead of Kippa-Ring, and a few continue further to Nambour. A few weekday morning services run only to Bowen Hills. The 2:09 pm service on Monday to Thursday runs to Doomben, with this time slot on Friday occupied by a Bowen Hills train. All weekend services depart from Platform 1.

During morning on-peak times (6:00–8:30 am, Monday to Friday), city bound services depart every six minutes at best, and during afternoon peak times (3:30–7:00 pm, Monday to Friday), terminating services arrive every 12 minutes at best. During off-peak times (except for early on Sunday mornings), services depart at 9-minutes-past and 21-minutes-to the hour, and terminating trains arrive at 24-minutes-past and 6-minutes-to the hour. Services take 41 minutes to reach Central, and 1 hour 36 minutes to reach Kippa-Ring.

Services by platform

Transport links
The Westside Bus Company operates four main routes via Springfield Central station using the name Bus Queensland, plus one additional school service each weekday morning. All buses depart from Stop A, at the western end of the station. The routes are:
522: Orion Springfield Central to Goodna Station (including one additional morning and afternoon service on school days only)
526: Orion Springfield Central to Redbank Station
531: Orion Springfield Central to Yamanto via Ripley
534: Orion Springfield Central to Browns Plains
5240: Old Logan Road to Orion Springfield Central (one morning service on school days only)

References

External links

Springfield Central station Queensland Rail
[ Springfield Central station] TransLink travel information

Railway stations in Australia opened in 2013
Railway stations in Ipswich City